Jet's America, Inc. (doing business as Jet's Pizza) is an American pizza franchise restaurant. It was founded in 1978 in the Detroit suburb of Sterling Heights, and operates primarily in the state of Michigan.

History
The first Jet's Pizza was opened in 1978 by brothers Eugene and John Jetts in Sterling Heights, Michigan. The original location was converted from a vacant party store into a restaurant. The Jetts later opened more locations and formed Jet's America Inc. with their cousins, Jim Galloway, Jr. and Jeff Galloway in 1992.

The first franchise location was opened in 1990. As of January 2023, Jet's Pizza had over 400 franchises in 20 states with restaurant locations in Arizona, Colorado, Florida, Georgia, Illinois, Indiana, Kentucky, Michigan, Minnesota, Missouri, New York, North Carolina, Ohio, Pennsylvania, South Carolina, Tennessee, Texas, Virginia, and Wisconsin.

Jet's is known for its square deep-dish Detroit-style pizza, including the 8-corner pizza which the company has trademarked. When the store first opened, the square pizzas were a novelty in the region. The original recipe came from the Jetts' mother and has not changed since 1978.

References

External links
Official website

Pizza chains of the United States
Restaurants established in 1978
Companies based in Macomb County, Michigan
1978 establishments in Michigan
American companies established in 1978